In the fantasy of J. R. R. Tolkien, the Dwarves are a race inhabiting Middle-earth, the central continent of Arda in an imagined mythological past. They are based on the dwarfs of Germanic myths who were small humanoids that lived in mountains, practising mining, metallurgy, blacksmithing and jewellery. Tolkien described them as tough, warlike, and lovers of stone and craftsmanship. 

The origins of Tolkien's Dwarves can be traced to Norse mythology; Tolkien also mentioned a connection with Jewish history and language.
Dwarves appear in his books The Hobbit (1937), The Lord of the Rings (1954–55), and the posthumously published The Silmarillion (1977), Unfinished Tales (1980), and The History of Middle-earth series (1983–96), the last three edited by his son Christopher Tolkien.

Characteristics 

The medievalist Charles Moseley described the dwarves of Tolkien's legendarium as "Old Norse" in their names, their feuds, and their revenges. In the appendix on "Durin's Folk" in The Lord of the Rings, Tolkien describes dwarves as:

The J. R. R. Tolkien Encyclopedia considers Tolkien's use of the adjective "thrawn", noting its similarity with Þráinn, a noun meaning "obstinate person", and a name found in the Norse list of Dwarf-names, the Dvergatal in the Völuspá. Tolkien took it for the name, Thráin, of two of Thorin Oakenshield's ancestors. It suggests this may have been a philological joke on Tolkien's part.

Dwarves were long-lived, with a lifespan of some 250 years. They breed slowly, for no more than a third of them are female, and not all marry. Tolkien names only one female, Dís, Thorin's sister. They are still considered children in their 20s, as Thorin was at age 24; and as "striplings" in their 30s. Despite his young age, Dáin Ironfoot was 32 when he killed Azog, the orc chieftain of Moria. They had children starting in their 90s.

The Dwarves are described as "the most redoubtable warriors of all the Speaking Peoples" – a warlike race who fought fiercely against their enemies, including other Dwarves. Highly skilled in the making of weapons and armour, their main weapon was the battle axe, but they also used bows, swords, shields and mattocks, and wore armour.

Origins 

The Dwarves are portrayed in The Silmarillion as an ancient people who awoke, like the Elves, at the start of the First Age during the Years of the Trees, after the Elves but before the existence of the Sun and Moon. The Vala Aulë, impatient for the arising of the Children of Ilúvatar, created the seven Fathers of the Dwarves in secret, intending them to be his children to whom he could teach his crafts. He also taught them Khuzdul, a language he had devised for them. Ilúvatar, creator of Arda, was aware of the Dwarves' creation and sanctified them. Aulë sealed the seven Fathers of the Dwarves in stone chambers in far-flung regions of Middle-earth to await their awakening.

Each of the Seven Fathers founded one of the seven Dwarf clans. Durin I was the eldest, and the first of his kind to awake in Middle-earth. He awoke in Mount Gundabad, in the northern Misty Mountains, and founded the clan of Longbeards (Durin's Folk); they founded the city of Khazad-dûm below the Misty Mountains, and later realms in the Grey Mountains and Erebor (the Lonely Mountain). Two others were laid in sleep in the north of the Ered Luin or Blue Mountains, and they founded the lines of the Broadbeams and the Firebeards. The remaining four clans, the Ironfists, Stiffbeards, Blacklocks, and Stonefoots came from the East. After the end of the First Age, the Dwarves spoken of are almost exclusively of Durin's line.

A further division, the even shorter , appears in The Silmarillion and The Children of Hurin. Mîm, the last known Petty-dwarf, has been said by Moseley to resemble the similarly named character Mime from the Nibelungenlied.

Artefacts

Mining, masonry, and metalwork 

As creations of Aulë, they were attracted to the substances of Arda. They mined and worked precious metals throughout the mountains of Middle-earth. They were unrivalled in smithing, crafting, metalworking, and masonry, even among the Elves. The Dwarf-smith Telchar was the greatest in renown. They built immense halls under mountains where they built their cities. They built many famed halls including the Menegroth, Khazad-dûm, and Erebor. Among the many treasures they forged were the named weapons Narsil, the sword of Elendil, the Dragon-helm of Dor-lómin and the necklace Nauglamír, the most prized treasure in Nargothrond and the most famed Dwarven work of the Elder Days. In The Hobbit, Thorin gives Bilbo a Mithril coat of linked rings of mail.

Language and names 

From their creation, the Dwarves spoke Khuzdul, one of Tolkien's invented languages, in the fiction made for them by Aulë, rather than being descended from Elvish, as most of the languages of Men were. They wrote it using Cirth runes, also invented by Tolkien. The Dwarves kept their language secret and did not normally teach it to others, so they learned both Quenya and Sindarin in order to communicate with the Elves, most notably the Noldor and Sindar. By the Third Age, however, the Dwarves were estranged from the Elves and no longer routinely learned their language. Instead, they both used the Westron or Common Speech, which was a Mannish tongue.

In the Grey-elvish or Sindarin the Dwarves were called Naugrim ("Stunted People"), Gonnhirrim ("Stone-lords"), and Dornhoth ("Thrawn Folk"), and Hadhodrim. In Quenya they were the Casári. The Dwarves called themselves Khazâd in their own language, Khuzdul.

In reality, Tolkien took the names of 12 of the 13 dwarves – excluding Balin – that he used in The Hobbit (and the wizard Gandalf's name) from the Old Norse Völuspá. When he came to The Lord of the Rings, where he had a proper language for the Dwarves, he was obliged to pretend, in the essay Of Dwarves and Men, that the Old Norse names were translations from Khuzdul, just as the English spoken by the Dwarves to Men and Hobbits was a translation from Westron.

Calendar 

Tolkien's only mention of the Dwarves' calendar is in The Hobbit, regarding the "dwarves' New Year" or Durin's Day, which occurs on the day of the last new moon of autumn. Astronomer Bradley E. Schaefer has analysed the astronomical determinants of Durin's Day. He concluded that – as with many real-world lunar calendars – the date of Durin's Day is observational, dependent on the first visible crescent moon.

Concept and creation

Norse myth 

In The Book of Lost Tales, the very few Dwarves who appear are portrayed as evil beings, employers of Orc mercenaries and in conflict with the Elves—who are the imagined "authors" of the myths, and are therefore biased against Dwarves. Tolkien was inspired by the dwarves of Norse myths and of Germanic folklore (such as those of the Brothers Grimm), from whom his Dwarves take their characteristic affinity with mining, metalworking, and crafting.

Jewish history 

In The Hobbit, Dwarves are portrayed as occasionally comedic and bumbling, but largely as honourable, serious-minded, and proud. Tolkien was influenced by his own selective reading of medieval texts regarding Jewish people and their history. The dwarves' characteristics of being dispossessed of their homeland in Erebor, and living among other groups but retaining their own culture, are derived from the medieval image of Jews, while, according to the Tolkien scholar John D. Rateliff, their warlike nature stems from accounts in the Hebrew Bible. Medieval views of Jews also saw them as having a propensity for making well-crafted and beautiful things, a trait shared with Norse dwarves. The Dwarf calendar invented for The Hobbit reflects the Jewish calendar's Rosh Hashanah in beginning in late autumn.

In The Lord of the Rings, Tolkien continued the themes of The Hobbit. When giving Dwarves their own language, Khuzdul, Tolkien decided to create an analogue of a Semitic language influenced by Hebrew phonology. Like medieval Jewish groups, the Dwarves used their own language only among themselves, and adopted the languages of those they live amongst for the most part, for example taking public names from the cultures they lived within, whilst keeping their "true-names" and true language a secret. Tolkien also invented the Cirth runes, in the fiction said to have been invented by Elves and later adopted by the Dwarves. Tolkien further underlined the diaspora of the Dwarves with the lost stronghold of the Mines of Moria. Tolkien elaborated on Jewish influence on his Dwarves in a letter: "I do think of the 'Dwarves' like Jews: at once native and alien in their habitations, speaking the languages of the country, but with an accent due to their own private tongue..." In the last interview before his death, Tolkien said "The dwarves of course are quite obviously, wouldn't you say, that in many ways they remind you of the Jews? Their words are Semitic, obviously, constructed to be Semitic." This raises the question, examined by Rebecca Brackmann in Mythlore, of whether there was an element of antisemitism, however deeply buried, in Tolkien's account of the Dwarves, inherited from English attitudes of his time. Brackman notes that Tolkien himself attempted to work through the issue in his Middle-earth writings.

Spelling 

The original editor of The Hobbit "corrected" Tolkien's plural "dwarves" to "dwarfs", as did the editor of the Puffin paperback edition. According to Tolkien, the "real 'historical' plural" of "dwarf" is "dwarrows" or "dwerrows". He described the word "dwarves" as "a piece of private bad grammar". In Appendix F of The Lord of the Rings, Tolkien explained that if people still spoke of "dwarves" regularly, English might have retained a special plural for the word "dwarf", as with the irregular plural of "goose", "geese". Despite his fondness for it, the form "dwarrow" only appears in his writing as "Dwarrowdelf" ("Dwarf-digging"), a name for Moria. He used "Dwarves", instead, corresponding to his "Elves" as a plural for "Elf". Tolkien used "dwarvish" and "dwarf(-)" (e.g. "Dwarf-lords", "Old Dwarf Road") as adjectives for the people he created.

Adaptations

Films 

In Rankin-Bass' 1977 animated film adaptation of The Hobbit, Thorin was voiced by Hans Conreid, with Don Messick voicing Balin, John Stephenson voicing Dori, Jack DeLeon voicing Dwalin, Fíli, Kíli, Óin, Glóin, Ori, Nori, Bifur, and Bofur, and Paul Frees voicing Bombur.

In Ralph Bakshi's 1978 animated film The Lord of the Rings, the part of the Dwarf Gimli was voiced by David Buck.

In Peter Jackson's live action adaptation of The Lord of the Rings film trilogy, Gimli's character is from time to time used as comic relief, whether with jokes about his height or his rivalry with Legolas. Gimli is played by John Rhys-Davies, who portrayed the character as having a Scottish accent.

In Jackson's three-film adaptation of The Hobbit, Thorin is portrayed by Richard Armitage, with Ken Stott as Balin, Graham McTavish as Dwalin, Aidan Turner as Kíli, Dean O'Gorman as Fíli, Mark Hadlow as Dori, Jed Brophy as Nori, Adam Brown as Ori, John Callen as Óin, Peter Hambleton as Glóin, William Kircher as Bifur, James Nesbitt as Bofur, and Stephen Hunter as Bombur. Jackson's films introduce a story arc not found in the original novel, in which Kili and the Elf Tauriel (a character also invented for the films) fall in love.

Role-playing games 

In Iron Crown Enterprises' Middle-earth Role Playing (1986), Dwarf player-characters receive statistical bonuses to Strength and Constitution, and subtractions from Presence, Agility and Intelligence. Seven "Dwarven Kindreds", named after each of the founding fathers—Durin, Bávor, Dwálin, Thrár, Druin, Thelór and Bárin—are given in The Lords of Middle-earth—Volume III (1989).

In Decipher Inc.'s The Lord of the Rings Roleplaying Game (2001), based on the Jackson films, Dwarf player-characters get bonuses to Vitality and Strength attributes and must be given craft skills.

In the real-time strategy game The Lord of the Rings: The Battle for Middle-earth II, and its expansion, both based on the Jackson films, Dwarves are heavily influenced by classical military practice, and use throwing axes, war hammers, spears, and circular or Roman-style shields. One dwarf unit is the "Phalanx", similar to its Greek counterpart.

References

Primary 
This list identifies each item's location in Tolkien's writings.

Secondary

Sources